The 2010 Richmond Kickers season was their eighteenth season overall and their last season in the USL Second Division.

Review 
The 2010 Richmond Kickers season was their eighteenth season overall and their last season in the USL Second Division. The Kickers finished in second place in the USL Second Division regular season standings. In the playoffs, the Kickers beat the Pittsburgh Riverhounds to advance to the championship game, which they lost to the Charleston Battery.

In the U.S. Open Cup, the Richmond Kickers beat Crystal Palace Baltimore and the Real Maryland Monarchs to advance to the third round. In the third round, they lost to D.C. United 2-1.

Roster

First team
As of February 18, 2013.

Overall standings

Match results

USL Second Division 
Home team is listed on the left.

Regular season

Playoffs

U.S. Open Cup

See also
Richmond Kickers
2010 in American soccer
2010 U.S. Open Cup

Notes

External links
 Richmond Kickers Official Website

2010
American soccer clubs 2010 season
2010 in sports in Virginia